Mikael Berg Kvinge (born 24 June 2003) is a Norwegian footballer who plays as a forward for Brann.

Career statistics

Club

Notes

References

2003 births
Living people
Footballers from Bergen
Norwegian footballers
Norway youth international footballers
Association football forwards
SK Brann players
Eliteserien players